Soavina Est is a town and commune in Madagascar. It belongs to the district of Nosy Varika in the region of Vatovavy. The population of the commune was  33.352 in 2018.

Primary and junior level secondary education are available in town. The majority 99% of the population of the commune are farmers.  The most important crop is rice, while other important products are coffee, sugarcane and cassava. Services provide employment for 1% of the population.

References and notes 

Populated places in Vatovavy